Alireza Ghorbani (born 4 February 1972) is an Iranian traditional vocalist.

Biography 
He began his career by reciting the Quran. Soon he began eagerly learning traditional Iranian music. In 1984, he was fascinated by compilations of poetry and music and the insight of Iranian music under the supervision of his first mentors: Khosro Soltani, Behrooz Abedini, Mahdi Fallah, Hossein Omoumi, Ahmad Ebrahimi and also Razavi Sarvestani. His acquaintance with Ali Tajvidi and Farhad Fakhreddini led him to new horizons of Iranian music.

He has taken part in many important festivals all over the world together with many musicians. Some of these festivals and programs are available on CD.
He has been the vocalist of Iran's National Orchestra since 1999 and has joined many concerts and festivals within Iran and abroad. Enthusiasm, the first album of National Iranian orchestra, has also been composed by Farhad Fakhreddini. Although he collaborated in making soundtracks for many different TV programs such as Kife Englisi, Shabe Dahom, Roshantar az Khamooshi (Mollasadra) and Madare Sefr Darajeh. His latest albums are Az Kheshto Khak, Fasle Baran, Rosvaye Zamaneh, Sarve Ravan, Symphony of Molana, Soogvarane Khamoosh, Rooy Dar Aftab 1,2, Eshtiagh, Ghafe Eshgh, Khoshnevise Seda and Sarmasti (Khayyam).

The concert of “ Hame Iranam” or A Persian Night with Vancouver Opera Orchestra conducted by Shardad Rohani, was performed at the Queen Elizabeth Theatre in Vancouver, Canada on January 6, 2018.  The world premier of Symphonic Poem "Hame Iranam" composed by Kambiz Roshan Ravan was performed in this concert and Alireza Ghorbani was the vocalist of this Symphonic Poem.

The concert of “Resurrection” or “A Persian Night"  with Vancouver Opera Orchestra featuring Vancouver  Bach Choir conducted by Leslie Dala, was performed at the  Orpheum theatre in Vancouver, Canada on January 20, 2019. Alireza  Ghorbani  was the vocalist in his second performance with Vancouver Opera Orchestra.

He collaborated with Homayoun Shajarian on his latest album Afsaneye-Chashmhayat released on 10 Nov 2019.

“The Voices and Bridges” is an ongoing multi-lingual, multicultural collaboration between musicians from many parts of the world including Alireza Ghorbani (lead singer) in collaboration with Ehsan Matoori as a composer and Bombay Jayashri, Celia Woodsmith, Qaiser Nizami, and others.  This music project is an exploration which brings together languages of ancient cultures such as Persian, Spanish, Arabic, English, Turkish, Indian and French to create a new story inspired. The style and genre used in the project is Global Music inspired by different musical traditions. All musical tracks are recorded acoustically. The lyrics are inspired by many prominent poets around the world such as Borges, Youshij, Pablo Neruda,d Allama Iqbal,  Lal Ded, Rabindranath Tagore, and Rumi.

Discography

See also
Music of Iran
Persian symphonic music

References

External links

 Official homepage
 
 Alireza Ghorbani on Spotify

1972 births
Living people
21st-century Iranian male singers
Singers from Tehran
Persian classical musicians
Barbad award winners